Oakland Air Route Traffic Control Center (ZOA), (radio communications, "Oakland Center") is one of 22  Area Control Centers in the United States. It is located at 5125 Central Ave, Fremont, California, roughly 25 miles southeast of downtown Oakland in the East Bay.

The primary responsibility of Oakland Center is sequencing and separation of over-flights, arrivals, and departures, in order to provide safe, orderly, and expeditious flow of aircraft filed under instrument flight rules (IFR).

Oakland Center is the 16th busiest ARTCC in the United States. Between January 1, 2017 and December 31, 2017, Oakland Center handled 1,752,411 aircraft. Domestically, Oakland Center KZOA covers approximately 140,000 square miles of the Western United States, including parts of California, and Nevada. Oakland Center KZAK also covers 18.7 million square miles of the Pacific Ocean, roughly 9.5% of the Earth's total surface area, making this the largest Area Control Center in the world by controlled surface area.

Oakland Center lies adjacent to 21 different domestic air facilities, including Seattle Air Route Traffic Control Center, Los Angeles Air Route Traffic Control Center, and Salt Lake City Air Route Traffic Control Center. ZOA overlies or abuts several approach control facilities (including Northern California TRACON).

References

External links

Oakland Center Weather Service Unit (CWSU) (NWS/FAA)

Air traffic control centers
Air traffic control in the United States
Fremont, California
Aviation in California